Chaqu-ye Bala (also Romanized as Chāqū-ye Bālā and Chāqū Bālā; also known as Chāqū and Chāqū-ye Pā’īn) is a village in Akhtarabad Rural District, in the Central District of Malard County, Tehran Province, Iran. At the 2006 census, its population was 21, in 7 families.

References 

Populated places in Malard County